The greater Papuan pipistrelle (Pipistrellus collinus) is a species of vesper bat found in Papua New Guinea and Irian Jaya.

References

Pipistrellus
Taxa named by Oldfield Thomas
Bats of Oceania
Endemic fauna of Papua New Guinea
Mammals of Papua New Guinea
Mammals described in 1920
Taxonomy articles created by Polbot
Bats of New Guinea